Durban is a city in KwaZulu-Natal, South Africa.

Durban may also refer to:

Places
 Durban, Gers, France, a commune
 Durban, Manitoba, Canada, an unincorporated community
 Aggijjat, Nunavut, Canada, formerly named Durban Island
 Roman Catholic Archdiocese of Durban
 Durban railway station, Durban, South Africa

People
 Alan Durban (born 1941), Welsh footballer and manager
 Arne Durban (1912–1993), Norwegian sculptor and art critic
 Pam Durban (born 1947), American novelist and short story writer

Other uses
 HMS Durban, a Royal Navy light cruiser
 Naval Base Durban, a South African Navy base
 World Conference against Racism 2001, also known as Durban I
 Durban Review Conference, a successor conference also known as Durban II
 Durban III, a 2011 United Nations General Assembly meeting marking the 10th anniversary of the adoption of The Durban Declaration and Programme of Action

See also 
 Benjamin D'Urban (1777–1849), British general and colonial administrator, namesake of the city
 D'Urban Armstrong (1897–1918), South African First World War flying ace
 Durbans, France, a commune
 Durbin (disambiguation)
 Turban (disambiguation)